Orthopteroids are insects which historically would have been included in the order Orthoptera and now may be placed in the Polyneoptera.  When Carl Linnaeus started applying binomial names to animals in the 10th edition of his Systema Naturae in 1758, there were few animals included in the scheme, and consequently few groups. As more and more new species were discovered and differences recognised, the original groups proposed by Linnaeus were split up.

Originally all orthopteroid insects were in the genus Gryllus, this genus now contains a group of closely related crickets. In the scheme used by Linnaeus the genus contained crickets, grasshoppers, locusts, katydids / bush crickets (Tettigoniidae), stick insects, and praying mantises. These groups, along with the cockroaches, which Linnaeus did treat differently, are all orthopteroid insects. The newly discovered order Mantophasmatodea is also an orthopteroid order.

The orthopteroid orders
Blattodea: cockroaches
Dermaptera: earwigs
Grylloblattodea: a small order, they look like a cross between cockroaches and crickets
Mantodea: praying mantises
Mantophasmatodea: mantophasmids – a small order only discovered in 2002
Orthoptera: crickets, grasshoppers, locusts and katydids / bush crickets (Tettigoniidae)
Phasmatodea: stick insects and leaf insects

References

Insect taxonomy